Luis Vinicius da Silva Matos (born January 26, 1995) is a Brazilian football player. He plays for Vegalta Sendai.

Career
Vinicius joined Vitória in 2014. He moved to Vegalta Sendai in 2017.

References

External links
soccerway.com

1995 births
Living people
Brazilian footballers
J1 League players
Vegalta Sendai players
Association football defenders